It's All About Love is a 2003 English-language Danish romance-drama film written and directed by Thomas Vinterberg. Its narrative can be classified as apocalyptic science fiction, but Vinterberg prefers to call it "a dream". Unlike the director's earlier Danish-language films, It's All About Love is entirely in English and stars Joaquin Phoenix, Claire Danes and Sean Penn. The production was led by Denmark's Nimbus Film, but the film was largely an international co-production, with involvement of companies from nine different countries in total. It was very poorly received by film critics.

Plot
In the year 2021, when the earth is devastated by continuous climate changes, with sudden waves of frost (it snows in the middle of summer even in Venice), John, a university lecturer, traveling from Poland to Calgary, stops in New York, to sign divorce papers for his wife Elena. A much beloved figure skating champion, Elena is followed by a very large entourage that takes care of her numerous commitments and all external relations.

John is detained one night in order to attend an important performance by Elena. Set to leave the next morning, he finds that not only has Elena not signed the divorce papers but, with very little explanation, she begs John for help. Still in love, indulges her. John discovers that Elena is the victim of a strange plot hatched by her own entourage. Three clones, perfectly identical to her, were made to replace her. The official explanation is to relieve her of the burden of an activity that is getting more difficult over time, but the fear is that once the clone training is over, the real Elena can be put aside.

Amid escapes and returns, the killing of the clones, the betrayal of his own family members, John and Elena go away first by train then on foot towards a safe place to resume a new life together, but in the end, they face the cold storms that are ravaging much of the Earth, and die, embraced.

The narration of the finale is entrusted to Marciello, John's brother, who in flight over the planet is one of the last survivors but is also destined to perish as it is not possible to land.

Cast
 Joaquin Phoenix as John
 Claire Danes as Elena
 Sean Penn as Marciello
 Douglas Henshall as Michael
 Alun Armstrong as David
 Margo Martindale as Betsy
 Mark Strong as Arthur
 Geoffrey Hutchings as Mr. Morrison

Production

The film was written, directed, and produced by Thomas Vinterberg over a period of five years. It was produced through Nimbus Film.

At a certain point during production Vinterberg called up Ingmar Bergman and asked him to come and help him finish the film, as he felt he could not complete it himself. Vinterberg recalled that:

He roared with laughter and said I had to be out of my mind. There was nothing he was less interested in. And he also said I was an idiot that had not decided fast enough what to do after The Celebration (Festen), which he, by the way, called a masterpiece. It was a very contended conversation.

(From an interview in Berlingske Tidende.)

Reception
The film was not very successful, and critics mostly panned it. Richard Roeper called the film "like Kubrick with a talent-ectomy" and Jack Matthews of the New York Daily News declared that "Surely, Vinterberg was high on some inert gas when he embarked on it". Dennis Lim of the Village Voice, however found something to like in the film: 
It's All About Love is, by any measure, a colossal folly – ridiculed at its Sundance '03 premier, supposedly disowned by its stars (rumor has it Claire Danes burst into tears upon seeing the end result) and jettisoned by original distributor Focus. But this $10 million Danish-British-French-U.S.-Japanese-Swedish-Norwegian-German-Dutch co-production is a film maudit for the ages — rapturous and inexplicable in equal measure.

References

External links 
 
 
Director interview about film
 

2003 films
2000s science fiction drama films
Danish science fiction drama films
American romantic drama films
Danish romantic drama films
Danish thriller films
2003 romantic drama films
Films set in 2021
Films set in the 2020s
Films set in the United States
Films shot in Denmark
Films directed by Thomas Vinterberg
Films scored by Zbigniew Preisner
Films about cloning
Nimbus Film films
American dystopian films
2000s English-language films
2000s American films